John Sidney "Slew" McCain (August 9, 1884 – September 6, 1945) was a U.S. Navy admiral and the patriarch of the McCain military family. McCain held several command assignments during the Pacific campaign of World War II. He was a pioneer of aircraft carrier operations. His operations off the Philippines and Okinawa and air strikes against Formosa and the Japanese home islands caused tremendous destruction of Japanese naval and air forces in the closing period of the war. He died four days after the formal Japanese surrender ceremony.

Several of McCain's descendants also graduated from the United States Naval Academy. He and his son, John S. McCain Jr., were the first father–son pair to achieve four-star admiral rank in the U.S. Navy during World War II. His grandson, John S. McCain III, was a prisoner of war during the Vietnam War. His great-grandsons, John S. McCain IV and James McCain, currently serve in the U.S. Navy and U.S. Marine Corps, respectively.

Early life, education, and family
John Sidney "Slew" McCain was born in Carroll County, Mississippi, the son and namesake of plantation owner John Sidney McCain (1851–1934) and wife Elizabeth-Ann Young (1855–1922), who married in 1877. His grandparents were William Alexander McCain (1812–1864) and Mary Louisa McAllister, who were married in 1840. His great-grandmother,  Mary Scales McCain, owned High Rock Farm, a plantation in Rockingham County, North Carolina.

He attended the University of Mississippi for two years, where he joined the Phi Delta Theta Fraternity, and then decided to attend the United States Military Academy at West Point, where his brother William Alexander McCain was enrolled.  To practice for its entrance exams, he decided to take the ones for the United States Naval Academy; when he passed those and earned an appointment, he decided to attend there instead.  In doing so, he would leave behind his Mississippi plantation and adopt the Navy's itinerant life.

At the Naval Academy, his performance was lackluster. He failed his annual physical on account of defective hearing, but the condition was waived due to the great need for officers.  When he graduated in 1906, he ranked 79th out of 116 in his class, and the yearbook labeled him "The skeleton in the family closet of 1906." His classmates included Arthur L. Bristol, William L. Calhoun, William A. Glassford, Charles C. Hartigan, Aubrey W. Fitch, Frank J. Fletcher, Robert L. Ghormley, Isaac C. Kidd, Leigh Noyes, Ferdinand L. Reichmuth, Raymond A. Spruance, John H. Towers, Russell Willson, and Thomas Withers.

He married Katherine Davey Vaulx (1876–1959), who was eight years his senior, on August 9, 1909, at Colorado Springs, Colorado.

Early career and World War I

Soon after earning his commission, McCain sailed aboard the Great White Fleet's world cruise from 1907 to 1909, joining the battleship  for the last stretch home.  His next assignment was to the Asiatic Squadron, after which the Navy ordered him to the naval base at San Diego, California.

During 1914 and 1915 he was executive officer and engineering officer aboard the armored cruiser , patrolling off the Pacific coast of Mexico.  In September 1915, he joined the armored cruiser USS San Diego, flagship for the Pacific Fleet.

After the U.S. entered World War I, McCain and San Diego served on convoy duty in the Atlantic, escorting shipping through the first dangerous leg of their passages to Europe. Based out of Tompkinsville, New York, and Halifax, San Diego operated in the weather-torn, submarine-infested North Atlantic. McCain left San Diego in May 1918, two months before she was sunk, when he was assigned to the Bureau of Navigation.

Interwar period

In 1935, McCain enrolled in flight training. Graduating at 52 in 1936, he became one of the oldest men to become a naval aviator and from 1937 to 1939 he commanded the aircraft carrier . In January 1941, after promotion to rear admiral, he commanded the Aircraft Scouting Force of the Atlantic Fleet.

Short in stature and of rather thin frame, McCain was gruff and very profane; he liked to drink and gamble.  He also showed courage and was regarded as a natural, inspirational leader. In the words of one biographical profile, McCain "preferred contentious conflict to cozy compromise."

World War II

After Japan attacked Pearl Harbor in December 1941, the Navy appointed McCain as Commander, Aircraft, South Pacific in May 1942. As COMAIRSOPAC, he commanded all land-based Allied air operations supporting the Guadalcanal campaign in the Solomon Islands and south Pacific area. Aircraft under McCain's command, including the Cactus Air Force at Henderson Field on Guadalcanal, were key in supporting the defense of Guadalcanal from Japanese efforts to retake the island during this time.

In October 1942, the Navy ordered McCain to Washington, D.C., to head the Bureau of Aeronautics. In August 1943, he became Deputy Chief of Naval Operations for Air with the rank of vice admiral.

McCain returned to combat in the Pacific in August 1944 with his appointment as commander of a carrier group in Marc Mitscher's Task Force 58 (TF 58), part of Raymond Spruance's Fifth Fleet. In this role, McCain participated in the Marianas campaign, including the Battle of the Philippine Sea, and the beginning of the Philippines campaign. At the Battle of Leyte Gulf, Admiral William Halsey left in pursuit of a decoy force, leaving Rear Admiral Clifton "Ziggy" Sprague's Task Unit 77.4.3 (usually referred to by its radio callsign, "Taffy 3") to continue supporting forces ashore, defended by only a light screen of destroyers and destroyer escorts.

Taffy 3 came under attack from a much heavier Japanese force under Vice Admiral Takeo Kurita, provoking the Battle off Samar. Sprague promptly pleaded for assistance from Halsey, who was responsible for protecting the northern approach to the landing site. Halsey had contemplated detaching a battle group, Task Force 34 (TF 34), but chose to bring all available battle groups north to pursue the Japanese carrier force. Hearing Sprague's pleas (including messages in plain language, not even bothering to encrypt them as the situation grew desperate), Admiral Nimitz sent Halsey a terse message which was decoded as:Where is, repeat, where is Task Force Thirty Four? The world wonders.The final phrase, "The world wonders", was not intended to be part of Nimitz's message in whole; it was cryptographic security padding that had been added to the end of the actual message which should have been removed by the decrypter. This unfortunate inclusion infuriated Halsey, who then sent McCain's Task Group 38.1 (TG 38.1) to assist.

McCain had been monitoring the original pleas for help and, recognizing the seriousness of the situation, turned around without awaiting orders. His ships raced downwind toward the battle, briefly turning into the wind to recover returning planes. Though the attack did little damage, it strengthened Kurita's decision to retire.

On October 30, 1944, McCain assumed command of Task Force 38 (TF 38). He retained command of the fast carrier task force that he led through the Battle of Okinawa and raids on the Japanese mainland.

While conducting operations off the Philippines, McCain, as Chief of Staff of Third Fleet, participated in Halsey's decision to keep the combined naval task force on station rather than avoid a major storm, Typhoon Cobra (later known also as "Halsey's Typhoon"), which was approaching the area. The storm sank three destroyers and inflicted heavy damage on many other ships. Some 800 men were lost, in addition to 146 aircraft. A Navy court of inquiry found that Halsey committed an error of judgment in sailing into the typhoon, but did not recommend sanction. McCain was ordered by the Navy Department on July 15 to hand over command of Task Force 38 to Admiral John H. Towers and, after a furlough, become deputy head of the Veterans Administration.

Death

By war's end in August 1945, the stress of combat operations, lifelong anxiety, and probable heart disease had taken its toll on McCain. He requested home leave to recuperate, but Halsey insisted that he be present at the Japanese surrender ceremony in Tokyo Bay on September 2. Departing immediately after the ceremony, McCain died just four days later of a heart attack at his home in Coronado, California. His death was front-page . He was buried at Arlington National Cemetery.

In 1949, McCain was posthumously promoted to full admiral (O-10) by a resolution of Congress. This followed a recommendation of Secretary of the Navy Francis P. Matthews, who said that McCain's combat commendations would have earned him the promotion had he not died so soon after the war.  During his career, McCain was awarded the Distinguished Service Medal and two Gold Stars in lieu of subsequent awards.

Family heritage
McCain's grandfather, William Alexander McCain (1817–1863) lived in Carrollton, Carroll County, Mississippi. During his life, he owned a  plantation there known alternately as "Teoc" (the Choctaw name for the creek it was located on) and "Waverly", as well as 52 slaves (some of whose descendants share the surname and call themselves the "black McCains").  He was married in 1840 to Mary Louisa McAllister (1812–1882).

McCain's father, the elder John Sidney McCain, known as J. S. McCain, served as sheriff and, later, President of the Board of Supervisors of Carroll County.

McCain's older brother, another William Alexander McCain, also attended the University of Mississippi before transferring to the United States Military Academy. William A. McCain would eventually retire with the rank of brigadier general, and was awarded the Distinguished Service Medal for actions in World War I, as well as the Oak Leaf Cluster during World War II. An uncle, Henry Pinckney McCain (1861–1941), also attended West Point and later retired from the Army as a major-general. Camp McCain, a World War II training base and current Mississippi National Guard training site, located in Grenada County, Mississippi, was named for him.

McCain's son, John S. McCain Jr., was a submarine commander in World War II and later served as a Commander in Chief Pacific Command (CINCPAC) during the wars in Korea and Vietnam.

McCain's grandson, John S. McCain III, was a U.S. Navy captain during the Vietnam War; his life and military career was known for spending five years as a prisoner of war in the "Hanoi Hilton" and other North Vietnamese camps from 1967 to 1972. Following his retirement from the Navy, he served as both a Congressman and Senator from Arizona. He ran for President twice, in 2000 (losing the Republican nomination to George W. Bush) and in 2008, when he won the Republican Party's nomination but lost the general election to Barack Obama. His book Faith of My Fathers recounts his heritage and his experiences as a midshipman at Annapolis, a naval aviator and prisoner of war. Senator McCain's brother Joe McCain attended the US Navy Academy but served in the US Navy as an enlisted man.

John S. McCain III claimed a royal connection on his campaign website: "McCain's family roots in Europe are Scots-Irish. His great-aunt was a descendant of Robert the Bruce, an early Scottish king. McCain's roots in America date to the American Revolution. John Young, an early McCain ancestor, served on Gen. George Washington's staff." John Young's ancestry has been traced to John Lamont, Baron McGorrie (the "red baron of Inverchaolain and Knockdow"; 1540–1583). According to DNA testing, Senator McCain was related through his mother to John Washington, a great-great-grandfather of President George Washington.

Admiral McCain's great-grandson John Sidney "Jack" McCain IV attended and graduated from the U.S. Naval Academy in 2009 and is a naval aviator. Jack McCain IV was awarded his diploma at Annapolis by President Obama, the man who defeated his father in 2008. Jack McCain IV is married to Capt. Renee Swift-McCain (USAF Reserve). Another great-grandson, James Hensley "Jimmy" McCain, enlisted in the Marine Corps in 2006. He finished a tour of duty in the Iraq War in 2008.  Another, Douglas McCain, served as a Navy A-6E Intruder carrier pilot before turning to commercial aviation.

Namesakes
McCain Field, the operations center at Naval Air Station Meridian, Mississippi, was named in his honor.

The guided-missile destroyer  (in service 1953–1978) was named for him, and the destroyer  (in service 1994–present) was named for Admiral John S. McCain Sr., Admiral John S. McCain Jr., and, as of a rededication ceremony 11 July 2018, Senator John S. McCain III.

McCain was a would-be author who wrote fiction that was never published, including some adventure stories under the name Casper Clubfoot.

Awards

Notes

References

Books
 
 
 
 
 
 
   Online access to Chapter 1 is available.
 Trimble, William F. Admiral John S. McCain and the Triumph of Naval Air Power Naval Institute Press, 2019) online review

External links

 John Sidney McCain at arlingtoncemetery.net, an unofficial website

1884 births
1945 deaths
United States Navy admirals
United States Navy World War II admirals
United States Naval Academy alumni
University of Mississippi alumni
United States Navy personnel of World War I
People from Carroll County, Mississippi
Military personnel from Mississippi
Burials at Arlington National Cemetery
United States Naval Aviators
Recipients of the Navy Cross (United States)
Recipients of the Navy Distinguished Service Medal
American people of Scotch-Irish descent
McCain family